Philip Stephens may refer to:
 Sir Philip Stephens, 1st Baronet (1723–1809), First Secretary of the Admiralty
 Philip Stephens (journalist) (born 1953), English journalist and author
 Philip Pembroke Stephens (1894–1937), journalist, foreign correspondent for the Daily Express and the Daily Telegraph
 Philip Stephens (cricketer) (born 1960), English cricketer

See also
Phil Stevens (disambiguation)
Stephens (surname)